Evaristo is both a given name and a surname. Notable people with the name include:

Given name:
 Evaristo Avalos (born 1933), Mexican equestrian
 Evaristo Barrera (1911–1982), Argentine football striker
 Evaristo Baschenis (1617–1677), Italian Baroque painter
 Evaristo Beccalossi (born 1956), Italian footballer
 Evaristo Carazo (1821–1889), President of Nicaragua
 Evaristo Carriego (1883–1912), Argentine poet
 Evaristo Carvalho (born 1942), President and former prime minister of São Tomé and Príncipe
 Evaristo Conrado Engelberg (1853–1932), Brazilian mechanical engineer and inventor
 Evaristo Coronado (born 1960), Costa Rican soccer striker
 Evaristo Costa (born 1976), Brazilian journalist
 Evaristo da Veiga (1799–1837), Brazilian poet, journalist, politician and bookseller
 Evaristo de Churruca y Brunet (1841–1917), Spanish engineer
 Evaristo de Macedo (born 1933), former Brazilian footballer
 Evaristo de Moraes Filho, Brazilian lawyer
 Evaristo Endanco (born 1896), Italian racing cyclist
 Evaristo Felice Dall'Abaco (1675–1742), Italian composer and violinist
 Evaristo Fernández Blanco (1902–1993), Spanish composer
 Evaristo Frisoni (born 1907), Italian professional football player
 Evaristo Garbani-Nerini (1867–1944), Swiss politician
 Evaristo Gherardi (1663–1700), Italian actor and playwright
 Evaristo Iglesias (1925–2005), Cuban sprinter
 Evaristo Isasi (born 1955), former Paraguayan football striker
 Evaristo Lucidi (1866–1929), Italian Catholic Cardinal
 Evaristo Manú (born 1982), Portuguese football player
 Evaristo Marc Chengula (1941–2018), Tanzanian Roman Catholic bishop
 Evaristo Márquez (1939–2013), Colombian actor and herdsman
 Evaristo Márquez Contreras (1929–1996), Spanish sculptor
 Evaristo Martelo Paumán (1850–1928), Spanish aristocrat, writer and politician
 Evaristo Mazzón (born 1960), Uruguayan boxer
 Evaristo Merino (1868–1930), Chilean Mayor of Pichilemu
 Evaristo Muñoz (1684–1737), Spanish Baroque painter
 Evaristo Nugkuag (born 1950), Peruvian activist
 Evaristo Oliva (born 1945), former Guatemalan cyclist
 Evaristo Ortega Zárate (disappeared 2010), Mexican journalist
 Evaristo Ortíz (born 1960), Dominican Republic sprinter
 Evaristo Pérez de Castro (1778–1849), Spanish politician and diplomat
 Evaristo Piza (born 1972), Brazilian football manager
 Evaristo Porras Ardila, Colombian drug lord
 Evaristo Prendes (born 1934), Argentine fencer
 Evaristo Ribera Chevremont (1890–1976), Puerto Rican poet
 Evaristo Rocha, 7th President of Nicaragua
 Evaristo "Tito" Rubio (1902–1938), Cuban American mobster
 Evaristo San Cristóval (1848–1900), Peruvian painter, illustrator, and engraver
 Evaristo Sourdis Juliao (1905–1970), Colombian lawyer and diplomat
 Evaristo Viñuales Larroy (1913–1939), Aragonese teacher and anarchist

Surname:
 Alberto Evaristo Ginastera (1916–1983), Argentinian composer
 Bernardine Evaristo (born 1959), British author
 Carlos Evaristo, Portuguese Canadian historian, archaeologist and author
 Conceição Evaristo (born 1946), Brazilian writer
 Diego Cristiano Evaristo (born 1992), known as Diego Pituca, Brazilian footballer
 Félix Evaristo Mejía (1866–1945), Dominican writer, diplomat, and educator
 Jesús Evaristo Casariego Fernández-Noriega (1912–1990), Spanish writer and publisher
 José Evaristo Corrales Macías, Mexican politician
 José Evaristo Uriburu (1831–1914), President of Argentina
 Juan Evaristo (1902–1978), Argentine footballer
 Mario Evaristo (1908–1993), Argentine footballer
 Mario Evaristo Leguizamón Martínez (born 1982), Uruguayan football player
 Paulo Evaristo Arns (1921–2016), Cardinal Archbishop Emeritus of São Paulo
 Ramón Evaristo (1909–1990), Spanish bandleader and violinist
 Shaun Evaristo, Filipino-American professional dancer and choreographer

See also
 Everest (disambiguation)
 Praia do Evaristo